Callicore lyca, the Aegina numberwing, is a butterfly of the family Nymphalidae. It is found from the south of Mexico to Peru.

Subspecies
The following subspecies are recognised:
 C. l. lyca in Mexico
 C. l. mionina (Hewitson, 1855) in Colombia
 C. l. aegina (C. & R. Felder, 1861) in southern Peru – Aegina numberwing or Aegina beauty
 C. l. salamis (C. & R. Felder, 1862)
 C. l. aerias (Godman & Salvin, 1883) in Guatemala, Nicaragua, Costa Rica, Panama
 C. l. mena (Staudinger, 1886) in Peru
 C. l. odilia (Oberthür, 1916) in Colombia
 C. l. exultans (Fruhstorfer, 1916) in Bolivia
 C. l. bella (Röber, 1924) in Colombia
 C. l. sticheli (Dillon, 1948) in Colombia

External links
"Callicore Hübner, [1819]" at Markku Savela's Lepidoptera and Some Other Life Forms

Biblidinae
Nymphalidae of South America
Butterflies described in 1847